Fourth Armored may refer to:
 4th Armored Division (United States)
 4th Light Armored Reconnaissance Battalion